Sven Enar Edberg (9 July 1936 – 9 February 2013) was a Swedish weightlifter. He won a bronze medal at the 1958 European Championships and placed 20th at the 1964 Olympics, in the featherweight event.

References

1936 births
2013 deaths
Swedish male weightlifters
Olympic weightlifters of Sweden
Weightlifters at the 1964 Summer Olympics
Sportspeople from Stockholm
20th-century Swedish people